In particle physics and quantum mechanics, mixing angles are the angles between two sets of (complex-valued) orthogonal basis vectors, or states, usually the eigenbases of two quantum mechanical operators. The choice of angles (parameterization) is not unique but based on convention.

Mathematics 
The relation between two eigenbases is described completely by a unitary matrix, the analogue of a rotation matrix in a complex vector space. The number of degrees of freedom in this matrix is usually reduced by removing any excess complex phase from the transformation, since in most cases that is not a measurable quantity.

For two-dimensional vector space this reduces the matrix to a rotation matrix, which can be described completely by one mixing angle. In a three dimensional space there are three mixing angles and one additional complex phase parameter. Different conventions exist for how the three angles are defined, such as Euler angles.

Notable mixing angles 
Some notable mixing angles in particle physics are:

 Neutrino mixing angles (PMNS matrix), describing the mixing between the mass and flavour eigenstates of neutrinos, which explains neutrino oscillations
 Quark mixing angles including the Cabbibo angle (CKM matrix), describing the mixing between the mass and flavour eigenstates of quarks
The Weinberg angle or weak mixing angle, describing the mixing between the electromagnetic and weak forces
 Higgs mixing angle

Particle physics
Quantum mechanics